There and Back is a CD released in 1997 which contains previously unissued live recordings by the Dick Morrissey Quartet. The five tracks were performed over two nights, with two different line-ups of the quartet, at Ronnie Scott's in London in 1964/1965. The liner notes were written by Derek Everett and Les Tomkins, with photographs by David Redfern.

Track listing 
Recorded 27 January 1964 
"There and Back" (Harry South)
"Stars Fell On Alabama" (Frank Perkins, Mitchell Parish)
"D.M. Blues" (Dick Morrissey)
"The Spirit Feel" (Milt Jackson)

Personnel 
Dick Morrissey - tenor saxophone
Harry South - piano
Phil Bates - bass
Jackie Dougan - drums

The following track was recorded 20 August 1965:

5. "Dick's Theme" (Dick Morrissey)

Personnel: as above except Phil Seamen replaces Jackie Dougan on drums.

References

Dick Morrissey albums
1997 live albums
Albums recorded at Ronnie Scott's Jazz Club